The  Kansas City Chiefs season was the franchise's 17th season in the National Football League and the 27th overall. It ended with a 10–6 record, the most wins for the franchise since 1971. The Chiefs clinched a wild card playoff berth, but lost to the New York Jets 35–15.

Former linebacker Willie Lanier was enshrined in the Pro Football Hall of Fame on August 2. On the field, the pieces started coming together for head coach John Mackovic. His offense displayed plenty of scoring punch, while the club's defense and special teams became increasingly effective. With the team sitting at 3–3, Bill Kenney replaced Todd Blackledge for the second half of the season in a game against San Diego, guiding the club to a 42–41 victory. That win was the first of four consecutive triumphs with Kenney at the helm, the club's longest winning streak since 1980. Poised with a 7–3 record after 10 games, three straight losses in November put the Chiefs playoff chances in jeopardy. Two December wins gave Kansas City a 9–6 mark, putting the Chiefs on the verge of their first postseason berth in 15 years.

The defining moment of the season came in the regular season finale at Pittsburgh on December 21. Despite being outgained in total yardage by a 515–171 margin, the Chiefs were able to notch a 24–19 victory as all of the team's points came via special teams on a blocked punt return, a field goal, a kickoff return and a blocked field goal return. With a 10–6 record the Chiefs earned an AFC Wild Card berth, winning a tiebreaker with Seattle. Kenney was injured in the fourth quarter of the Steelers contest, meaning Blackledge drew the starting assignment for the club's first playoff contest since 1971, a 35–15 loss at New York.

Mackovic was fired after the season.

NFL Draft

Personnel

Staff

Roster

Preseason

Regular season

Schedule 

Note: Intra-division opponents are in bold text.

Game summaries

Week 1: vs. Cincinnati Bengals

Week 2: at Seattle Seahawks

Week 3: vs. Houston Oilers

Week 4: at Buffalo Bills

Week 5: vs. Los Angeles Raiders

Week 6: at Cleveland Browns

Week 7: vs. San Diego Chargers

Week 8: vs. Tampa Bay Buccaneers

Week 9: at San Diego Chargers

Week 10: vs. Seattle Seahawks

Week 11: at Denver Broncos

Week 12: at St. Louis Cardinals

Week 13: vs. Buffalo Bills

Week 14: vs. Denver Broncos

Week 15: at Los Angeles Raiders

Week 16: at Pittsburgh Steelers

Standings

Postseason

Schedule

Game summaries

AFC Wild Card Playoffs: at (4) New York Jets

Quarterback Pat Ryan led the Jets to the victory with 3 touchdown passes. The Chiefs scored first on a 67-yard drive capped by running back Jeff Smith. On their ensuing possession, the Jets faced fourth down and 6 on the Kansas City 33-yard line. Rather than attempt a long field goal, Ryan faked a handoff and rushed for a 24 yard gain. Two plays later, running back Freeman McNeil scored on a 4-yard rushing touchdown. In the second period, Ryan completed two touchdown pass: a 1-yarder to McNeil and an 11-yarder to wide receiver Al Toon. On the first play of the second half, Jets linebacker Kevin McArthur returned an interception 21 yards for a touchdown. Ryan later clinched the victory in the fourth period with a 6-yard touchdown pass to tight end Billy Griggs. The Chiefs' only scores in the second half was a blocked punt recovery in the end zone, and an intentional safety by the Jets.

McNeil finished the game with 135 rushing yards, 3 receptions for 16 yards, and 2 touchdowns.

References

External links 
 1986 Kansas City Chiefs at Pro-Football-Reference.com

Kansas City Chiefs
Kansas City Chiefs seasons
Kansas